Earnley is a village and a civil and ecclesiastical parish in the Chichester District of West Sussex, England. It is located four miles (6.4 km) south-west of Chichester, and lies on the south coast of England. The parish includes the settlements of Almodington and Batchmere.

History
An Anglo-Saxon charter of AD 780 names a piece of land as 'Earnaleach and Tielesora' that was given to the church of St Paul. Then in a charter, dated AD930, King Æthelstan granted to Bishop Beornheah of Selsey, land at Medmerry in Selsey 'with the woodland and fields lying therewith called Erneleia'.

Historically Earnley was situated in the hundred of La Manwode or Manwood, now known under the form Manhood. The name La Manwode means 'the common wood' and extended round Hundredsteddle Farm, where the boundaries of the Witterings, Birdham, and Earnley coincide. Hundredsteddle was the meeting place for the hundred moot and other hundred business. The name Hundredsteddle refers to the floor on which the Hundred court would have sat. It lay in the ancient pre-Conquest division of Sussex known as the Rape (county subdivision) of Chichester. The Domesday survey does not include Earnley, however it is possible that at that time it was included in Wittering.  The mediæval lords of the manor here belonged to the Ernle, Ernley, or Erneley family, and derived their surname from a manor they held in this parish. The land being given to Luke de Ernele by his nephew, William de Lancing as part of a Knight's fee, in 1166.

Earnley Church is a grade II* listed church and together with its small graveyard is contained within retaining stone walls of an interesting boat shaped island of land. The nave is of 13th-century origin. A century later the chancel was added; an aumbry fitted with a carved door dates back to the 14th century. The first recorded rector was in office in 1365; parish registers survive from 1562, but there is no record of a dedication. It has always simply been "Earnley Church".

Placename

The O.E. form of Earnley was Earnlēah. 'Earn' meaning Eagle (or possibly a persons name) and 'lēah' wood, glade or clearing.

Culture and community

 In June every year since 2016 the Parish Council holds an annual fete.

Landmarks
Part of the Site of Special Scientific Interest Bracklesham Bay runs along the coastline of the parish.

Notes

References

Sources: Victoria History of the County of Sussex, volumes 2 and 7

External links
 Earnly Parish Council Website

Villages in West Sussex
Chichester District
Ernle family